George V. Menke (died March 13, 1978) was an American football player and coach. He served as the head football coach at American University in Washington, D.C. in 1939. Menke played college football at Catholic University of America.

References

Year of birth missing
1978 deaths
American football guards
American Eagles football coaches
Catholic University Cardinals football players
Coaches of American football from Washington, D.C.
Players of American football from Washington, D.C.